Mohd Shahrul Mat Amin (born 9 June 1989) is a Malaysian cyclist, who currently rides for UCI Continental team .

Major results

2010
 1st Stage 1 Jelajah Malaysia
 2nd Road race, National Road Championships
 3rd Melaka Governor Cup
2011
 1st  Road race, National Road Championships
 1st Stage 4 Tour de Brunei
 1st Stage 7 Tour d'Indonesia
 10th Melaka Chief Minister's Cup
2012
 1st Stage 3 Jelajah Malaysia
 Perlis Open
1st Stages 1 & 3
 8th Tour de Okinawa
 8th Overall Tour of Borneo
2013
 1st  Road race, National Road Championships
 1st  Points classification Tour de Ijen
 1st Stage 3 Tour de Taiwan
2014
 7th Melaka Chief Minister's Cup
2016
 1st Stage 8 Tour de Singkarak
 National Road Championships
3rd Road race
3rd Time trial
2017
 1st Stage 9 Tour de Singkarak
 1st Stage 4 Tour de Lombok
 2nd  Road race, Southeast Asian Games

References

External links

1989 births
Living people
Malaysian male cyclists
Southeast Asian Games medalists in cycling
Southeast Asian Games silver medalists for Malaysia
Cyclists at the 2018 Asian Games
Competitors at the 2013 Southeast Asian Games
Asian Games competitors for Malaysia
20th-century Malaysian people
21st-century Malaysian people